Onondaga Lake is a lake in Central New York, immediately northwest of and adjacent to Syracuse, New York. The southeastern end of the lake and the southwestern shore abut industrial areas and expressways; the northeastern shore and northwestern end border a series of parks and museums.

Although it is near the Finger Lakes region, it is not traditionally counted as one of the Finger Lakes. Onondaga Lake is a dimictic lake, meaning that the lake water completely mixes from top to bottom twice a year.

Onondaga Lake has two natural tributaries that contribute approximately 70% of the total water flow to the lake. These tributaries are Ninemile Creek and Onondaga Creek. The Metropolitan Syracuse Wastewater Treatment Plant (METRO) contributes 20% of the annual flow. No other lake in the United States receives as much of its inflow as treated wastewater. The other tributaries, which include Ley Creek, Seneca River, Harbor Brook, Sawmill Creek, Tributary 5A, and East Flume, contribute the remaining 10% of water flow into the lake.  The tributaries flush the lake out about four times a year.  Onondaga Lake is flushed much more rapidly than most other lakes. The lake flows to the northwest and discharges into Seneca River which combines with the Oneida River to form the Oswego River, and ultimately ends up in Lake Ontario.

The lake is considered sacred within the indigenous territory of the Onondaga Nation. The Onondaga people lost control of the area following the American Revolutionary War, in which the Onondaga allied with the British. During the late 19th century, many resorts were constructed along the lake's shoreline, as it was a destination of great beauty. The Onondaga Nation continues to have a religious and cultural presence on the shores of the lake today.

With the industrialization of the region, much of the lake's shoreline was developed; domestic and industrial waste, due to industry and urbanization, led to the severe degradation of the lake. Unsafe levels of pollution led to the banning of ice harvesting as early as 1901. In 1940, swimming was banned, and in 1970 fishing was banned due to mercury contamination. Mercury pollution is still a problem for the lake today.  Despite the passage of the Clean Water Act in 1973 and the closing of the major industrial polluter in 1986, Onondaga Lake remained one of the most polluted lakes in the United States until several initiatives, including a 15-year multi-stage program completed in late 2017, allowed the lake to reach criteria required by the New York State Department of Environmental Conservation and the United States Environmental Protection Agency. This includes implementing a long-term operation, maintenance, and monitoring program to ensure the effectiveness of the remedy.

History

Before European settlement 
Onondaga Lake was the birthplace of the Haudenosaunee, a confederacy of indigenous nations including the Mohawk, Onondaga, Oneida, Cayuga, and Seneca. According to the story of the Great Peacemaker, these different nations were culturally separated and often at war with one another. The Peacemaker is said to have brought these nations together at the shores of Onondaga lake, and there the members of these nations formed a new system of governance.

The Haudenosaunee, or people of the longhouse, was founded as a conscious league based on principles of mutual respect and peaceful communication. The Onondaga nation website describes this event as the formation of “the first representative democracy in the West.”

The event was recorded with the creation of the Hiawatha Belt, a wampum whose design would later be used as the Flag of the Iroquois Confederacy. This belt also captures the guiding principles of the Haudenosaunee, the story of the Great Peacemaker, and the founding of the league at Onondaga Lake. As such, the lake became sacred, and was remembered as the place where the message of peace prevailed.

Early European settlement

Europeans began to learn about salt springs in the area in 1654, when the Onondagas revealed their presence to French explorers. Jesuit missionaries visiting the Syracuse region in the same time period were the first to report on salty brine springs around the southern end of what they called "Salt Lake," known today as Onondaga Lake. The brine springs were reported to have extended around much of the lake for a distance of nearly 9 miles. They extended from the present-day towns of Salina through Geddes and from Liverpool to near the mouth of Ninemile Creek. European settlers, mostly trappers and traders, followed the Jesuit missionaries and French explorers into the Syracuse area during the 17th and 18th centuries. After the French and Indian War, British traders replaced the French, but encounters were limited.
 
British-American colonists began salt production in the area in the late 18th century. Following the victory of the United States in the American Revolutionary War, it made the Treaty of Fort Stanwix in 1788 with the Six Nations of the Iroquois. Among its provisions was the transfer of the lands around the lake from the Onondaga Nation to local salt producers on the condition that the salt would be produced for the common use of everyone. By 1822, due to a high incidence of malaria, the lake's water level was lowered after its outlet to the Seneca River was dredged. The low-lying swampy area, located in what is now the northern end of downtown Syracuse, was drained.

The completion of the Erie Canal through New York state in the mid 1820s and the commercial production of salt brought an increase in settlement of the area. The lake's western shore became increasingly industrialized as the nineteenth century progressed.

Onondaga Lake also became a popular resort area. By the late 19th century, its shoreline was dotted with hotels, restaurants, and amusement parks. The area was so popular that people traveled by railroad from as far as New York City to visit the lake. Fish from the lake were harvested and served in restaurants across the state.

Industry

Salt brine and limestone were the key raw materials for the production of soda ash, used to make the industrial products of glass, chemicals, detergent, and paper. The abundance of salt brine and limestone in Onondaga Lake's watershed area attributed greatly for the industrialization along the lake's shoreline. Beginning in 1838, New York State authorized the drilling of deep wells at several locations around the lake. The wells were intended to locate the source of the brine, but no source was located.

The Solvay Process Company, incorporated in 1881, began drilling deep test holes in the area south of Syracuse in 1883. The company's main product was soda ash, integral to several industries. Eventually Solvay found halite deposits at a depth of 1,216 feet below land surface in the southern end of Tully Valley. From 1890 to 1986, more than 120 wells were drilled into four halite beds on the east and west flanks of the valley. Soda ash production began in 1884. The company was producing about 20 tons of soda ash per day, dumping most of its waste material directly into Onondaga Lake. Eventually wastebeds were built along the southwest perimeter of the lake to contain the by-products of soda ash production. In 1907, the New York State Attorney General threatened the Solvay Process Company with legal action over the direct discharge of Solvay waste material into the lake.
 
As Syracuse's population began to grow in the 20th century, a surplus of pollution hit the lake hard. This lake was so close to the city that the effects of people's sewage, exhaust fumes, and dumping of unnecessary products all caused the lake to decline in popularity, fishing, and even swimming.

In 1920, the Solvay Process Company merged with four other chemical companies, forming Allied Chemical and Dye Corporation. In 1950 it began the production of chlorine by mercury cell in 1950. Mercury-contaminated waste was also dumped directly into Onondaga Lake. Allied Chemical and Dye Corporation became Allied Chemical Corporation in 1958. Its continued practice of allowing mercury into the lake led to the federal and state governments banning fishing in 1970, due to mercury contamination of the fish. The US Attorney General sued Allied Chemical to halt the dumping of mercury into the lake. It is estimated that Allied Chemical was dumping approximately 25 pounds of mercury into Onondaga Lake per day. In 1981 Allied Chemical Corporation become Allied Corporation; in 1985 it changed its name to Allied-Signal, Inc. when it merged with the Signal companies. The company announced that it would close its operations in Syracuse because of changes in environmental laws, and in 1986 began dismantling its facility.

In 1989, New York State filed a lawsuit against Allied-Signal, Inc. for its part in contamination of Onondaga Lake. New York State and Allied-Signal, Inc. signed an interim Consent Decree detailing the elements of a Remedial Investigation and Feasibility Study to be undertaken of the lake. In compliance with the Consent Decree, the study was conducted by Allied-Signal, Inc. which became Honeywell, Inc. in 1999.

Non-salt-producing companies also became established along the Onondaga Creek valley from the mid-19th century to the early 20th century. Many of these companies drilled wells into the underlying sand to obtain water for cooling purposes. They were protecting dairy products and beer, storing perishable goods, and regulating temperature in office and storage buildings by such water use. Once used, the water was disposed of in nearby streams that drained to Onondaga Lake. This practice increased the salinity of the surface-water system.

Parks & recreation

Long Branch Park 

Long Branch Park is a public park in Onondaga County, New York, located in the town of Liverpool at 3813 Long Branch Road near NYS Route 370 and John Glenn Boulevard.  The park is located on the northern shore of Onondaga Lake near Onondaga Lake Park, but it has no formal relation to it and is operate separately.

Onondaga Lake Park 

Onondaga Lake Park is another county park. It hugs the eastern shore of the lake and has its offices at 6790 Onondaga Lake Trail in Liverpool. The park offers seven miles of shoreline, with a variety of areas for family picnics, including developed areas in Willow Bay and Cold Springs.

Onondaga Lake Park Marina 
The Onondaga Lake Park Marina is located on Onondaga Lake Parkway in Liverpool.

Wegmans Good Dog Park 

The Wegmans Good Dog Park was the first of its kind in Central New York and is located in the Cold Springs Mud Lock section of Onondaga Lake Park. It is open from sunrise to sunset, seven days a week year round.

Dogs are allowed to exercise without leashes in a  fenced-in area which includes an exercise area with tunnels, jumps and bridges complete with red fire hydrants.

Entrance to the park is located at 49 Cold Springs Trail in Liverpooloff NYS Route 370. Suggested donation of $1 per person at the main gate. The park is maintained with private donations.

Museums

Mission of Sainte Marie

The Old French Fort at the Mission of Sainte Marie was the site of an early attempt by French Jesuits and colonists to establish a base in Central New York. In the 1930s, the remains of the original fort were replaced with what was claimed to be a "replica" or reconstruction of the site. Research since then has revealed that it was a poor imitation.

During the 1980s, a decision was made to replace the structure with a historically accurate reconstruction. In addition, a visitor's center was built. This is used for the display of archeological artifacts recovered from the area, in a more accurate and "hands on" living museum.

As of January 1, 2013 the Onondaga Historical Association (OHA) took over management of the Onondaga County facility known as "Sainte Marie among the Iroquois" located on the eastern shore of Onondaga Lake. The site is currently planning to repurpose the facility into a Haudenosaunee (Iroquois) Heritage Center named Skä•noñh Center – Great Law of Peace Center. Skä•noñh, is an Onondaga welcoming greeting meaning Peace and Wellness.

Salt Museum

The Salt Museum was built around a still-standing boiling block chimney. It opened in 1933 during the Great Depression.

Events 

Syracuse Hydrofest - The North American championship of hydroplane racing - annual event in the Willow Bay area of Onondaga Lake Park in mid-June.
Lights on the Lake - Onondaga Lake Park in Liverpool from late November to early January.

Pollution

Sewage wastewater 

One major source of pollution for Onondaga Lake is municipal sewage. For years, Syracuse dumped human waste into the lake with little or no treatment. Before European settlement and the growth of a large population in the area, the lake was oligo-mesothropic, meaning that it contained low levels of aquatic plant blooms.

But, the high levels of ammonia and phosphates due to the dumping of sewage wastewater have led to excessive algae growth in the lake. When these excessive algae growths die, bacteria decompose the dead algae using large quantities of oxygen, which causes eutrophic and low-oxygen conditions. The low oxygen levels lead to the choking out of fish and plants, especially in the deeper areas of the lake. Eventually anoxic (oxygen-free) conditions set in parts of the lake and anaerobic decomposition takes place which emits harmful and foul-smelling gases like hydrogen sulfide.

Combined sewer overflow (CSO) also contributes pollution. In some areas of Syracuse, sewers carry both sanitary sewage and stormwater. During dry weather, these sewers carry all the sanitary sewage to Metro for treatment; however, during times of heavy rain or melting snow, the amount of water is greater than the capacity of the sewers. They overflow and discharge a combination of runoff and sanitary sewage into Onondaga Creek and Harbor Brook. Through these tributaries, the CSO eventually reaches Onondaga Lake. CSO has been generating concerns about bacteria. In the 1960s, Syracuse had ninety points where CSO could reach Onondaga Creek, Harbor Brook, or Ley Creek.

Chemical pollution

The Allied Chemical Corporation contributed greatly to the chemical pollution of Onondaga Lake. The surface water was found to be contaminated with mercury whereas the sediments are contaminated with polychlorinated biphenyls (PCBs), pesticides, creosotes, heavy metals (lead, cobalt, and mercury), polycyclic aromatic hydrocarbons (PAHs), chlorinated benzenes, and BTEX compounds (benzene, ethylbenzene, toluene, xylene). In Onondaga Lake the chlorinated benzenes are located in the southwest portion, in the form of a dense oily liquid that has settled into the sediments. These chemicals were intentionally dumped into the lake or unintentionally seeped in from upland toxic waste sites or from the Solvay wastebeds located at the southwest end of Onondaga Lake. Approximately 6 million pounds of salty wastes made up of chloride, sodium, and calcium were dumped into the lake before Allied Chemical closed in 1986.

Mercury contamination has been a major pollution issue. Between 1946 and 1970, 165,000 pounds of mercury was discharged into Onondaga Lake by Allied Chemical and Dye Corporation. In 2002, the findings from the remedial investigation conducted by successor Honeywell, Inc., with the supervision of the New York State Department of Environmental Conservation (NYSDEC), reported that mercury contamination was found throughout the lake: the most elevated concentrations were in the sediments of the Ninemile Creek delta and of the southwestern portion of the lake. A fishing ban was imposed in 1970 due to mercury contamination.

In 1999, the New York State Department of Health (NYSDOH) lifted the advisory on eating bass, white perch, and catfish from Onondaga Lake. The advisory against eating walleye remained in effect; and women of childbearing age, infants, and children under the age of 15 were advised against eating any of the fish from the lake. In 2007, the NYSDOH updated its advisory, prohibiting the consumption of largemouth and smallmouth bass over 15-inches-long. No walleye, carp, channel catfish, and white perch of any size should be consumed. The Department of Health advises not more than four meals per month of brown bullhead and pumpkinseed, and not more than one meal per month of any species not listed.

Mudboils

Approximately 18 miles south of Syracuse, the Tully Valley has unique hydro-geological features called mudboils. These mudboils are the cause of the excessive sedimentation of Onondaga Lake. The sediment enters Onondaga Creek, which flows north into the lake. Sediment loading is a problem because it degrades water quality, decreases water clarity, and reduces habitat for aquatic insects, fish spawning, and plants.

Legal action & cleanup efforts

Sewage pollution cleanup

The first steps taken to control sewage pollution occurred in 1907 with the creation of the Syracuse Interceptor Sewage Board. It served to address sewage-related problems in Onondaga Creek and Harbor Brook. In 1960, Onondaga County established a sewer district and built the Metropolitan Sewage Treatment Plant ("Metro") on the south shore of the lake.

In 1987, Atlantic States Legal Foundation (ASLF), a Syracuse-based organization providing legal and technical assistance to citizens and organizations dealing with environmental problems, filed a lawsuit against Onondaga County alleging that Metro and the combined sewer overflow (CSO) discharges were violating federal water pollution standards established under the Clean Water Act of 1972. The state of New York joined as a plaintiff with allegations that Onondaga County had also violated the New York State Environmental Conservation Law. In 1988, ASLF, the state of New York, and Onondaga County reached a settlement
outlined in a Consent Judgement which required the county to pay Upstate Freshwater Institute to create water quality models for the lake. These models would then form the basis for discharge limits imposed on the county's Metro facility.
In 1990, the U.S. Congress created the Onondaga Lake Management Conference (Public Law 101-596, section 401). It ordered the group to develop a comprehensive revitalization, conservation, and management plan for Onondaga Lake that recommends priority corrective actions and compliance schedules for its cleanup. The Conference also called for coordination of implementing the plan. The largest responsibility of the Onondaga Lake Management Conference was the completion of the Onondaga Lake Management Plan.

In 1997, New York State, Onondaga County, and ASLF reached an agreement, the Onondaga Lake Amended Consent Judgement (ACJ), on municipal wastewater collection and treatment improvements. The ACJ called for a schedule to attain compliance with the Clean Water Act. The ACJ is a multi-year program designed to improve the water quality of Onondaga Lake while achieving full compliance with state and federal water quality regulations by December 1, 2002. ACJ projects are divided into three main categories: wastewater treatment, collection system, and lake and tributary monitoring. In January 1998, a federal judge approved the ACJ  and in September 1999, the Onondaga Lake Management Conference approved and endorsed the Amended Consent Judgment (ACJ). It incorporated the ACJ into its 1993 Onondaga Lake Management Plan entitled, A Plan of Action.

The final stage for ammonia discharge improvements occurred in 2004. The biological aerated filter (BAF) system allows for year-round nitrification of wastewater. In 2004, Metro's annual ammonia discharge was reduced to 152 metric tons and by 2005, the annual discharge fell to 21 metric tons. The ACJ also led to the creation of an ambient monitoring program (AMP) to track the effectiveness of the improvements made to the wastewater collection and treatment infrastructure. The AMP is designed to identify sources of materials to the lake, evaluate in-lake water quality conditions, and examine the interactions between Onondaga Lake and Seneca River. Since 2007, Onondaga Lake has been in full compliance with the ambient water quality standards for ammonia. It was officially de-listed for that particular parameter in the State's 2008 list of impaired bodies of water.

The ACJ achieved other successes. Between 1993 and 2006, the phosphorus discharges from Metro were decreased by 86%. Regarding contamination via CSOs, the ACJ required that by 2010 the county eliminate or capture for treatment 95% of the CSO volume generated during heavy rain and snow melt.

Chemical pollution cleanup
In 1989 the State of New York filed a lawsuit against Allied-Signal, Inc. The lawsuit sought to compel the company to clean up the hazardous wastes that it and its predecessors had dumped into and around the lake. In 2005, New York State Department of Environmental Conservation (NYSDEC) and the US Environmental Protection Agency (EPA) issued a Record of Decision that outlined the remediation plans of Onondaga Lake. The Federal Court approved a Consent Decree in 2007, obliging Honeywell International, Inc. to implement the NYSDEC/EPA cleanup plan for the contaminated sediments in the bottom of the lake. Honeywell signed the Consent Decree that same year and began the Remedial Design and Remedial Action for the Onondaga Lake Bottom Site.

The cleanup plan called for the dredging of up to 2.65 million cubic yards of contaminated sediments to a depth that will allow for a cap to be built without losing any lake surface area. The plan also called for the installation of a barrier wall made of steel on the southwest corner of the lake to prevent contamination from the wastebeds from getting into the lake. In 2011, Honeywell completed second-phase construction on this barrier wall. The estimated cost of the cleanup plan was $451 million; an estimated $414 million in order to construct the remedy, followed by an annual maintenance cost of $3 million.

Dredging began in July 2012. The sediments were hydraulically dredged from the bottom of the lake and piped to a sediment consolidation area in Camillus, New York. The dredging was completed in November 2014, a year ahead of schedule, having removed approximately 2.2 million cubic yards of contaminated sediment.

The plan called for a cap covering 580 acres of lake-bottom. Capping began in August 2014, and was completed in 2016. Habitat restoration was completed in November 2017.

In 2015, the EPA's first five-year review found that the addition of diluted calcium nitrate solution was effective in containing methylmercury (MeHg) in deep areas of the lake, which helped reduce MeHG concentrations throughout the lake and in zooplankton. At depths of 10–19 meters, the amount of MeHg has decreased by 97% since 2006.

Audubon New York honored Honeywell with the 2015 Thomas W. Keesee, Jr. Conservation Award for its role in “one of the most ambitious environmental reclamation projects in the United States.”

As part of the scope of the cleanup project, Honeywell has funded and operates the Onondaga Lake Visitors Center, which opened in 2012. The center, located on land owned by the New York State Department of Transportation adjacent to Honeywell's cleanup headquarters on the southwestern shore, presents information about the ongoing cleanup.

The Onondaga Nation is not content with the Remedial Action plan for the Onondaga Lake Bottom Site. Their website states that the dredging plan will not include the additional 8 million cubic yards that the NYSDEC found to be contaminated. They do not believe that isolation caps are a permanent, reliable form of containment. The caps will not cover the entirety of the lake-bottom and they will eventually fail. The Onondaga Nation has said that New York State goals do not include making the lake swimmable or fishable, which are criteria included in the Clean Water Act. The total estimated plan, according to Onondaga Nation, of a thorough cleanup would cost $2.16 billion.

In 2022, the lake was declared to be at its cleanest in 100 years.

Sedimentation control
Since 1992, the Onondaga Lake Partnership has supported the efforts of the United States Geological Survey (USGS) in the following remedial activities: the diversion of surface water away from the mudboils, the installation of a dam on the stream that flows from the mudboils area, and the drilling of wells to reduce the pressure around the mudboils (21). The installation of several depressurization wells has led to dramatic decreases in sediment loading; an average of 30 tons per day was reduced to 1 ton per day.

Onondaga land rights claim 

The lake is also subject of a land right action filed on March 11, 2005, by the Onondaga Nation. The Onondaga Nation is seeking the protection and conservation of the natural resources within and affecting the Nation's land, and the security of Onondaga rights to hunt, fish, and gather resources for subsistence and cultural needs. According to Sid Hill, the Tadodaho of the Iroquois, the Onondaga people want the water, land, and air returned to its condition prior to being illegally taken by New York State in the 18th and 19th centuries. Hill considers the degraded state of Onondaga Lake as evidence that neither New York State nor federal authorities can adequately care for the land and water resources. The land rights action was dismissed by a federal judge on September 22, 2010.

Fishing improvements

Dating back to the 1600s, Onondaga Lake has always shown reports of a cold-water system supporting certain types of fish. Around the late 1800s, degradation occurred and the fish that once thrived in the lake such as the American eel, Atlantic Salmon and Whitefish declined. The decrease in population was resulting from the increase in temperatures because of severe pollution and human activities taking place. Even though the species are starting to gain numbers in this lake once again, the evidence shows that pollution had a direct impact on the fish that once inhabited this environment.

A survey in 1928 showed the lake was habitat for only ten remaining species. After clean-up and restoration efforts, researchers found a total of 54 species of fish captured in the lake between 1990 and 1999. The quality of sport fishing for large and small-mouth bass has gained national acclaim.

In 2011, Brown Trout were listed among Onondaga Lake's Common Species, and Lake Sturgeon, stocked in nearby Oneida Lake, had returned. In addition, in recent years, areas around the lake have become an overwintering spot for bald eagles, a demonstration that the fishing is good.

See also 

 Central New York Regional Market
 Destiny USA
 Erie Canal
 Geddes, New York
 Honeywell, Inc.
 Inner Harbor, Syracuse
 Liverpool, New York
 Mercury poisoning
 NBT Bank Stadium
 Ninemile Creek
 New York State Fair
 Onondaga Creek
 Onondaga Creekwalk
 Seneca River

References

External links

Our Lake: Central NY Near-Real-Time Surface Water Quality Network
USA Today: Honeywell agrees to spend $451 million to clean up NY lake
Onondaga Lake Park Marina, 2010

 
Lakes of Onondaga County, New York
Geography of Syracuse, New York
Lakes of New York (state)
Parks in Syracuse, New York
Superfund sites in New York (state)
Central New York